Chapsa microspora is a species of lichen in the family Graphidaceae. Found in Brazil, it was described as new to science in 2011 by German lichenologist Klaus Kalb.

References

Ostropales
Lichen species
Lichens described in 2011
Lichens of South America
Taxa named by Klaus Kalb